Phryneta crassa is a species of beetle in the family Cerambycidae. It was described by Karl Jordan in 1903. It is known from the Central African Republic, Gabon, and the Democratic Republic of the Congo.

References

Phrynetini
Beetles described in 1903